Fervor may refer to:

 enthusiasm (particularly religious enthusiasm)
 Fervor Records, an independent record label
 Fervor EP, an album by Jason & The Scorchers